Wallace Geoffrey was a British writer and actor.

Partial filmography
Actor
 Brown Sugar (1931)
 The House Opposite (1931)
 The Flying Fool (1931)
 Life Goes On (1932)
 Aren't We All? (1932)
 On Secret Service (1933)
 Boomerang (1934)
 The Outcast (1934)
 The Return of Bulldog Drummond (1934)
 Chick (1936)
 The Scarab Murder Case (1936) (lost)
 Premiere (1938)

References

External links

Year of birth unknown
Year of death unknown
British male film actors